The Revd W. P. Hanbury was Rector of St Cyprian’s Church, Kimberley on the South African Diamond Fields, 1882–1884.

Previous appointments
Hanbury had served at the Church of St Mary Magdalene, Paddington.

In South Africa
Fr. Hanbury came to Kimberley South Africa in 1882. It is said that he became worn out by anxiety and overwork and, having been sent to England to recruit workers, he did not return.

Hanbury was assisted in Kimberley by Fr. John T. Darragh who later established St John’s College in Johannesburg.

References

Year of birth missing
Year of death missing
19th-century South African Anglican priests
English emigrants to South Africa